The title of Lord Ross was a Lordship of Parliament in the Peerage of Scotland. It was created in 1499 for Sir John Ross, of Halkhead.

The second Lord died at the Battle of Flodden. The 12th Lord was appointed Lord Lieutenant of Renfrew in 1715. He also inherited Balnagown from David Ross of Balnagown in 1732, and thus became Chief of Clan Ross, though the Rosses of Halkhead were not descended from the ancient Earls of Ross. The title became extinct or dormant on the death of the 14th Lord, 19 August 1754.

Elizabeth, daughter of the 13th Lord, married John Boyle, 3rd Earl of Glasgow. In 1815 their son George Boyle, 4th Earl of Glasgow was created Baron Ross, of Hawkhead, in the Peerage of the United Kingdom, which title became extinct in 1890 on the death of his son George Boyle, 6th Earl of Glasgow. Grizel, another daughter of the 13th Lord, married Sir James Lockhart, 2nd Baronet of Carstairs, and their descendants succeeded to Balnagown and as Chiefs of Clan Ross, adopting the name Lockhart-Ross.

Lords Ross (1499)
 John Ross, 1st Lord Ross (d. 1501)
 John Ross, 2nd Lord Ross (d. 1513)
 Ninian Ross, 3rd Lord Ross (d. 1556)
 James Ross, 4th Lord Ross (d. 1581)
 Robert Ross, 5th Lord Ross (d. 1595)
 James Ross, 6th Lord Ross (d. 1633)
 James Ross, 7th Lord Ross (d. 1636)
 William Ross, 8th Lord Ross (d. 1640)
 Robert Ross, 9th Lord Ross (d. 1648)
 William Ross, 10th Lord Ross (d. 1656)
 George Ross, 11th Lord Ross (d. 1682)
 William Ross, 12th Lord Ross (d. 1738)
 George Ross, 13th Lord Ross (d. 1754)
 William Ross, 14th Lord Ross (d. 1754)

See also
 Clan Ross
 Earl of Ross
 Duke of Ross
 Baron Ross
 Lockhart-Ross Baronets

Sources
 
 http://www.thepeerage.com/p20759.htm

Dormant lordships of Parliament